Zinc sulfide (or zinc sulphide) is an inorganic compound with the chemical formula of ZnS. This is the main form of zinc found in nature, where it mainly occurs as the mineral sphalerite. Although this mineral is usually black because of various impurities, the pure material is white, and it is widely used as a pigment. In its dense synthetic form, zinc sulfide can be transparent, and it is used as a window for visible optics and infrared optics.

Structure

ZnS exists in two main crystalline forms. This dualism is an example of polymorphism. In each form, the coordination geometry at Zn and S is tetrahedral. The more stable cubic form is known also as zinc blende or sphalerite.  The hexagonal form is known as the mineral wurtzite, although it also can be produced synthetically.  The transition from the sphalerite form to the wurtzite form occurs at around 1020 °C. A tetragonal form is also known as the very rare mineral called polhemusite, with the formula .

Applications

Luminescent material
Zinc sulfide, with addition of few ppm of suitable activator, exhibits strong phosphorescence. The phenomenon was described by Nikola Tesla in 1893), and is currently used in many applications, from cathode ray tubes through X-ray screens to glow in the dark products. When silver is used as activator, the resulting color is bright blue, with maximum at 450 nanometers. Using manganese yields an orange-red color at around 590 nanometers.  Copper gives long-time glow, and it has the familiar greenish glow-in-the-dark. Copper-doped zinc sulfide ("ZnS plus Cu") is used also in electroluminescent panels.  It also exhibits phosphorescence due to impurities on illumination with blue or ultraviolet light.

Optical material
Zinc sulfide is also used as an infrared optical material, transmitting from visible wavelengths to just over 12 micrometers. It can be used planar as an optical window or shaped into a lens. It is made as microcrystalline sheets by the synthesis from hydrogen sulfide gas and zinc vapour, and this is sold as FLIR-grade (Forward Looking Infrared), where the zinc sulfide is in a milky-yellow, opaque form. This material when hot isostatically pressed (HIPed) can be converted to a water-clear form known as Cleartran (trademark). Early commercial forms were marketed as Irtran-2 but this designation is now obsolete.

Pigment
Zinc sulfide is a common pigment, sometimes called sachtolith. When combined with barium sulfate, zinc sulfide forms lithopone.

Catalyst
Fine ZnS powder is an efficient photocatalyst, which produces hydrogen gas from water upon illumination. Sulfur vacancies can be introduced in ZnS during its synthesis; this gradually turns the white-yellowish ZnS into a brown powder, and boosts the photocatalytic activity through enhanced light absorption.

Semiconductor properties
Both sphalerite and wurtzite are intrinsic, wide-bandgap semiconductors. These are prototypical II-VI semiconductors, and they adopt structures related to many of the other semiconductors, such as gallium arsenide. The cubic form of ZnS has a band gap of about 3.54 electron volts at 300 kelvins, but the hexagonal form has a band gap of about 3.91 electron volts. ZnS can be doped as either an n-type semiconductor or a p-type semiconductor.

History
The phosphorescence of ZnS was first reported by the French chemist Théodore Sidot in 1866. His findings were presented by A. E. Becquerel, who was renowned for the research on luminescence. ZnS was used by Ernest Rutherford and others in the early years of nuclear physics as a scintillation detector, because it emits light upon excitation by x-rays or electron beam, making it useful for X-ray screens and cathode ray tubes. This property made zinc sulfide useful in the dials of radium watches.

Production

Zinc sulfide is usually produced from waste materials from other applications.  Typical sources include smelter, slag, and pickle liquors. As an example- the synthesis of ammonia from methane requires a priori removal of hydrogen sulfide impurities in the natural gas, for which zinc oxide is used. This scavenging produces zinc sulfide:
ZnO + H2S → ZnS + H2O

Laboratory preparation
It is easily produced by igniting a mixture of zinc and sulfur. Since zinc sulfide is insoluble in water, it can also be produced in a precipitation reaction. Solutions containing Zn2+ salts readily form a precipitate ZnS in the presence of sulfide ions (e.g., from H2S).
Zn2+ + S2− → ZnS
This reaction is the basis of a gravimetric analysis for zinc.

References

External links

 Zinc and Sulfur at The Periodic Table of Videos (University of Nottingham)
 Composition of CRT phosphors
 University of Reading, Infrared Multilayer Laboratory optical data
  melting point

Sulfides
sulfide
II-VI semiconductors
Luminescence
Optical materials
Phosphors and scintillators

Zincblende crystal structure
Wurtzite structure type